The etymology of Aberdeen is that of the name first used for the city of Aberdeen, Scotland, which then bestowed its name to other Aberdeens around the world, as Aberdonians left Scotland to settle in the New World and other colonies.

The local Doric pronunciation,  (with a long ay sound), is frequently rendered .

Aberdeen 
The area we know as Old Aberdeen today is the approximate location of the first and original Scottish settlement of Aberdeen.

Aber- prefix 

Meaning 
It can also be used as a metaphor for a harbour."

 is used as a prefix in many placenames in Scotland and  more often Wales.

Origin 
 is a common Brythonic element, meaning a "confluence". It is presumably that the Pictish language was at least partly P-Celtic as evidenced by various names. Other examples of this prefix in Scotland are Aberfeldy, Aberdour, and Aberbrothick (an old form of Arbroath).

Locations 
Aber- can be found all over Scotland, predominantly on the east coast. 

As well as the east coast of Scotland, places with the prefix Aber- or a variant are found all over Wales, on the west coast of England and in Brittany. They are not found on the east coast of England or in Ireland.

-deen end element 
The second element is more contentious.

Scottish Gaelic 
Although  the north east variety of Scottish Gaelic has died out, it was present in the region (cf. Book of Deer) for centuries, as is attested to by Goidelic placenames in the region such as Inverurie, Banchory, Kincorth and Balgownie and was spoken as recently as 1984 (Braemar).

Greek and Latin sources 

However, although Devana is usually attributed to Aberdeen there is a possibility the capital could have been Barmekyne Hill in Banffshire. The general surmise is that the name  refers to a river name. However, there is no consensus which river could be meant, as there are several river names resonating with the Graeco-Roman :
 , name of the Denburn (a stream or burn running through the city) and which featured in Ptolemy's System Of Geography of 146 AD;
  for the river Dee (and also the Roman name for other rivers of the same name in Scotland and Wales, as well as the name of the Deva River, Spain);
  for the river Don (and also the name for a Celtic river goddess).

The Romans and subsequently European scholars (using Latin as the lingua franca of scholarship, as did the Catholic Church), referred to Aberdeen with various Latin names well into the modern era:
 
 
 
 
 
  (a name referenced in modern times by the street, Devanha Gardens, and the now closed Devanha Distillery and Devanha Brewery)

Nicknames
Aberdeen also has a number of nicknames, and poetic names:
 "The Granite City"  – the most well-known, due to the copious use of local grey granite in the city's older buildings.
 "The Silver City by the Golden Sands" or often simply just the "Silver City". Less flatteringly, also "the Grey City". This again is partly due to the granite.
 "Oil Capital of Europe"  – There are numerous variants on this, such as "Oil Capital of Scotland" etc.
 "Energy Capital of Europe" – the name now being used in the city as it tries to project a "greener" image, not based on oil.

Academic variations

Kennedy
William Kennedy proposes the spelling variations:
 Aberdaen
 Aberdin
 Aberdene
 Abrydene

Orkneyinga saga & Old Norse
The Orkneyinga saga records an Old Norse variant of the name, clearly cognate with the modern form.

Unlikely sources 
There have been more eccentric etymologies, e.g. Boxhorn considered it Phoenician in origin. This is unlikely, however, as no Phoenician sites have been found this far north.

Residents
Residents or natives of Aberdeen are known as Aberdonians, whence Aberdeen F.C.'s nickname, "the Dons".

Notes

References

Further reading 
 

History of Aberdeen
Aberdeen
Aberdeen